Vipassana Meditation Centre is a Buddhist centre in Singapore set up in 1993 to propagate and perpetuating Theravada Buddhism and provide opportunity for the practice of Vipassana meditation in Singapore. This group is not related to non-sectarian society "Vipassana International Center (Singapore)", which offers 10 Day residential meditation courses, taught by SN Goenka, in the tradition of Sayagyi U Ba Khin.

Overview

Vipassana Meditation Centre was founded in 1993 as a non-profit organization with the objective of providing opportunities and a venue for all Buddhists and non-Buddhists alike in cultivating their dhamma practice.

Notable advisors and teachers affiliated with the meditation centre include Ovadacariya Sayadaw U Panditabhivamsa.
There are several meditation locations across the world (Examples: Singapore,  Australia, China,  South Korea)

See also
 Burmese Buddhist Temple
 Palelai Buddhist Temple
 Wat Ananda Metyarama Thai Buddhist Temple
 Sri Lankaramaya Buddhist Temple
 Ti-Sarana Buddhist Association
 Bodhiraja Buddhist Society
 Vipassana meditation
 Vipassana movement
 Mindfulness (psychology)
 Acceptance and commitment therapy
 Mindfulness-based stress reduction
 Neural mechanisms of mindfulness meditation

References

External links
  

Buddhist temples in Singapore